John Egerton, 1st Earl of Bridgewater KB, PC (1579 – 4 December 1649) was an English peer and politician from the Egerton family.

The son of Thomas Egerton, 1st Viscount Brackley and Elizabeth Ravenscroft, he matriculated at Brasenose College, Oxford in 1589 at the age of 10, and received a Bachelor of Arts in 1594.

He was a Member of Parliament (MP) for Callington from 1597 to 1598, and for Shropshire in 1601. Knighted on 8 April 1599, he was Baron of the Exchequer of Chester from 1599 to 1605. In 1603, Egerton was appointed Knight of the Order of the Bath and in 1605, he received a Master of Arts from the University of Oxford. Having succeeded to his father's titles in March 1617, he was created Earl of Bridgewater on 27 May 1617.

Egerton was sworn of the Privy Council in 1626. From 1605 to 1646, he was Custos Rotulorum of Shropshire and from 1628 to 1649 Custos Rotulorum of Buckinghamshire.  Between 1631 and 1634, he was Lord President of Wales and Lord Lieutenant of Wales and the Marches of Herefordshire, Monmouthshire, Shropshire and Worcestershire.

John Milton's Comus celebrates the installation of Egerton, as Lord President of Wales.  Egerton died intestate and was buried in Little Gaddesden.

The 1st Earl of Bridgewater is commemorated by a memorial at the Bridgewater Chapel at St. Peter and St. Paul Church, Little Gaddesden, Hertfordshire.  In the early 17th century, the 1st Earl's father had purchased Ashridge House, one of the largest country houses in England, from Queen Elizabeth I, who had inherited it from her father who had appropriated it after the dissolution of the monasteries in 1539.  Ashridge House served the Egerton family as a residence until the 19th century.  The Egertons later had a family chapel with burial vault in Little Gaddesden Church, where many monuments commemorate the Dukes and Earls of Bridgewater and their families. Lord Bridgewater died on 4 December 1649.

Family
On 27 June 1602, Egerton married Lady Frances Stanley, daughter of Ferdinando Stanley, 5th Earl of Derby and Lady Alice Spencer, Lord Egerton's step-mother (after Ferdinando Stanley's death, on 20 October 1600, Lady Alice had married John's father Thomas Egerton, 1st Viscount Brackley). John and Frances had eight children:

Lady Elizabeth Egerton (d. 1688), married David Cecil, 3rd Earl of Exeter
Lady Mary Egerton (d. 1659), married Richard Herbert, 2nd Baron Herbert of Chirbury
Lady Frances Egerton (d.1664), married Sir John Hobart, 2nd Baronet
Lady Alice Egerton (d. 1689), married Richard Vaughan, 2nd Earl of Carbery as his third wife.
Lady Arabella Egerton (d. 1669), married Oliver St John, 5th Baron St John of Bletso
James Egerton, Viscount Brackley (1616–1620), died young
Charles Egerton, Viscount Brackley  (b. 1623), died young
John Egerton, 2nd Earl of Bridgewater (1623–1686)

References 

General

Further reading
 The Earl of Bridgewater and the English Civil War C L Hamilton, Canadian Journal of History, xv (1980), pp. 357–69

|-

|-

1579 births
1649 deaths
01
John
Knights of the Bath
Lord-Lieutenants of Herefordshire
Lord-Lieutenants of Monmouthshire
Lord-Lieutenants of Shropshire
Lord-Lieutenants of Wales
Lord-Lieutenants of Worcestershire
Members of the Parliament of England for Callington
Members of the Privy Council of England
17th-century English nobility
English MPs 1597–1598
English MPs 1601
16th-century English nobility
Viscounts Brackley